Soban Singh Jeena University (SSJ University) is a state university situated at Almora, Uttarakhand, India. The University was established in 2020 under the Soban Singh Jeena University Act, 2019 (Uttrakhand Act No. 19 of 2020), which was approved by the cabinet of Uttarakhand in October 2019. The university started operation in August 2020 when Prof. Narendra Singh Bhandari, the founder Vice-Chancellor of the university, assumed his position.

The University has three campuses affiliated to it :-
 Soban Singh Jeena Campus, Almora
 Laxman Singh Mahar Campus, Pithoragarh
 Pt. Badri Dutt Pandey Campus, Bageshwar
Both the Pithoragarh and Bageshwar campuses were established in 2020 with the separation of SSJ University from Kumaun University.

References

External links
 Official website

Universities in Uttarakhand
Educational institutions established in 2020
2020 establishments in Uttarakhand